Austin Jackson may refer to:

Austin Jackson (baseball) (born 1987), American baseball center fielder
Austin Jackson (American football) (born 1999), American football offensive tackle